Chibuike Okeke (born 9 September 1979) is a Nigerian former professional footballer who played as a midfielder.

References

External links
 
 

1979 births
Living people
Association football midfielders
Nigerian footballers
Nigeria international footballers
1. FC Union Berlin players
Chemnitzer FC players
Berliner AK 07 players